The Hunt class was a class of escort destroyer of the Royal Navy. The first vessels were ordered early in 1939, and the class saw extensive service in the Second World War, particularly on the British east coast and Mediterranean convoys. They were named after British fox hunts. The modern Hunt-class GRP hulled mine countermeasure vessels maintain the Hunt names lineage in the Royal Navy.

History
The Royal Navy had identified the need for two types of destroyer: larger vessels with heavy gun and torpedo armaments for fleet work and another type for escort duties. Although old fleet destroyers could be allocated to escort work, they were unsuitable for the task and new construction replaced them. Fleet destroyers were designed for speed and their machinery was inefficient at convoy speeds, reducing their range. Their shape made them poor sea boats at low speed, also exacerbated by additional equipment on the superstructure. Modifications were needed to ease these problems.

The escort vessels forsook the heavy armament and some of the speed of the fleet type to reduce unit cost and better suit mass production and the conditions. This new "fast escort vessel" was later classified as an "escort destroyer".

Eighty-six Hunts were completed, of which 72 were commissioned into the Royal Navy and the remaining 14 were transferred to allied navies; Bolebrooke, Border, Catterick, Hatherleigh, Modbury, Bramham and Hursley to the Greek Royal Hellenic Navy, Bedale, Oakley (i) and Silverton to the Free Polish Navy, Glaisdale, Eskdale and Badsworth to the Royal Norwegian Navy and Haldon to the Free French Navy.

Design
The guns were controlled by a Fuze Keeping Clock AA fire control computer when engaging aircraft. The first twenty were ordered in March and April 1939. They were constructed to Admiralty standards, as were contemporary destroyers, unlike the frigates, which conformed much more to mercantile practice.

Clearly, the Hunts posed a major design challenge. They would be too short and narrow and of insufficient range for open ocean work, being restricted to the North Sea and Mediterranean Sea. This sacrifice was accepted to give any chance of meeting the requirements. The demanding specifications in an overworked Admiralty design department resulted in a major design miscalculation. When the detailed calculations were done the centre of gravity was lower than expected and the beam was increased. As the first ships were being completed it was found that the design was as much as 70 tons overweight, top-heavy, leaving them dangerously deficient in stability. The first twenty ships were so far advanced in construction that it was necessary to remove the 'X' 4-inch gun mount and add 50 tons of permanent ballast. These ships became the Type I group and had the multiple 2-pounder guns relocated from behind the funnel to the more advantageous 'X' position.

The design deficiency of the Type I was rectified by splitting the hulls lengthwise and adding a 2½ foot section, increasing the beam to 31 ft 6 in and the margin of stability sufficiently for the designed armament to be shipped. These ships became the Type II group, and also had a revised design of bridge with the compass platform extending forwards to the wheelhouse face. Under the 1939 Emergency War Programme, 36 more Hunts had been ordered; three of these were completed to the original (Type I) design. Depth charge stowage could also be increased from 40 in the Type I to 110.

For the 1940 building programme, torpedoes were deemed necessary. The next 27 ships were completed to a revised design, the Type III group, and were intended specifically for Mediterranean work. They sacrificed 'Y' gun for a pair of 21-inch torpedo tubes amidships, the searchlight being displaced to the aft shelter deck as a result. The Type III Hunts could be easily identified as they had a straight funnel with a sloping top and the foremast had no rake. Fourteen of them had their stabiliser fins removed (or not fitted in the first place) and the space used for extra fuel oil.

The last two Hunts came from an independent lineage and were built to a private design that had been prepared pre-war by John I. Thornycroft & Company. Submitted to the Admiralty and rejected in 1938, a modified design had been accepted in 1940. They were known as the Type IV. They had a novel hull design, with a U-shaped forward section with a distinctive double knuckle and a full centre section with a square turn at the bilge. Other features included a long fo'c'sle stretching for most of the length of the ship, which increased internal accommodation space (the lack of which was a perennial problem in wartime ships with enlarged crews) and allowed the crew to fight the ship almost completely undercover. As a result, 'X' gun was now at the fo'c'sle deck level rather than on a raised shelter deck. The design was large enough to carry a triple set of torpedoes, but as they too were at fo'c'sle deck level the training apparatus had to be remotely mounted a deck below.

Armament was completed by a pair of single 20 mm Oerlikon guns on the bridge wings and a pair of power operated twin 0.5-inch Vickers machine guns amidships. This was quickly discovered to be ineffective and was replaced by the Mark V twin mounting for the Oerlikon guns. The level of protection afforded to the crews in these two ships was found to be beneficial in wartime, where crews were often closed up at action stations for extended periods of time in appalling weather conditions, and the design – although it was something of a dead end – heavily influenced post-war escort designs.

All Hunt class except three Type II and the Type IV Brissenden had fin stabilisers forward to reduce rolling to make for a steadier gun platform. These were subsequently removed from the majority of the Type III ships to allow for an increase in bunkerage of 63 tons.

Modifications
The Hunt class was a very satisfactory design, but had limited surplus displacement to allow any major modifications. All ships had a pair of single Oerlikon guns added in the bridge wings as they became available, and Type 285 radar added to the Rangefinder-Director Mark I carried on the bridge for the main armament. The air warning Type 286 radar was added at the masthead, later replaced by Type 291, and Cotswold, Silverton, Bleasdale and Wensleydale had their searchlight replaced by Type 272 radar, a centimetric target indication set.

Those vessels employed on East Coast convoy work, all the Type Is, the Type IIs Avon Vale, Blencathra and Liddesdale and the Type IIIs Bleasdale and Glaisdale were fitted with a single QF 2-pounder "bow chaser" gun for anti-E-boat work. Most Type IIIs later had their single Oerlikon guns replaced with twin powered mountings Mark V, and some had two single 40 mm Bofors guns added, one each forward of the wheelhouse and on the quarterdeck.

Type I

The first ten of the following were ordered on 21 March 1939, and the other ten on 11 April 1939. Three more were ordered on 4 September 1939 (see below) were intended to be of Type II, but were actually completed to the Type I design.

 
 Builder: Cammell Laird, Birkenhead
 Laid down: 8 June 1939
 Launched: 12 December 1939
 Completed: 23 March 1940
 Fate: Paid off October 1945 and broken up 25 November 1957.
 
 Builder: Cammell Laird, Birkenhead
 Laid down: 8 June 1939
 Launched: 29 January 1940
 Completed: 6 June 1940
 Fate: Bombed during the Dieppe Raid 19 August 1942.
 
 Builder: Yarrow, Scotstoun
 Laid down: 9 June 1939
 Launched: 22 February 1940
 Completed: 22 July 1940
 Fate: paid off 26 March 1946, and broken up 2 July 1957.
 
 Builder: Yarrow, Scotstoun
 Laid down: 7 July 1939
 Launched: 24 April 1940
 Completed: 18 September 1940
 Fate: Paid off September 1945; sold to be broken up 1957, but wrecked en route to the scrapyard.
 
 Builder: Vickers-Armstrong, Tyne
 Laid down: 8 June 1939
 Launched: 28 December 1939
 Completed: 28 August 1940
 Fate: Paid off 1945 and broken up 28 May 1956.
 
 Builder: Vickers-Armstrong, Tyne
 Laid down: 8 June 1939
 Launched: 25 January 1940
 Completed: 1 November 1940
 Fate: Sunk by E-boat S-30, off Lowestoft, 25 February 1941.
 
 Builder: John Brown & Company, Clydebank
 Laid down: 8 June 1939
 Launched: 9 January 1940
 Completed: 29 May 1940
 Fate: Aircraft target ship August 1945 to 1947. Paid off 1947, and broken up 7 November 1956.
 
 Builder: John Brown & Company, Clydebank
 Laid down: 8 June 1939
 Launched: 14 February 1940
 Completed: 1 July 1940
 Fate: Paid off December 1945 and broken up 15 August 1958.
 
 Builder: Swan Hunter, Wallsend
 Laid down: 8 June 1939
 Launched: 12 December 1939
 Completed: 8 June 1940
 Fate: Paid off December 1945 and broken up 4 February 1958.
 
 Builder: Swan Hunter, Wallsend
 Laid down: 29 June 1939
 Launched: 8 February 1940
 Completed: 10 August 1940
 Fate: Paid off 20 May 1946 and broken up 20 November 1956.
 
 Builder: Yarrow, Scotstoun
 Laid down: 11 October 1939
 Launched: 18 July 1940
 Completed: 16 November 1940
 Fate: Paid off 29 June 1946 and broken up 11 September 1957.
 
 Builder: Yarrow Shipbuilders, Scotstoun
 Laid down: 12 December 1939
 Launched: 5 September 1940
 Completed: 29 December 1940
 Fate: Paid off 28 February 1946. Sold to Egypt in 1950 as Ibrahim el Awal, renamed Mohamed Ali el Kebir in 1951, scrapped.

 
 Builder: Swan Hunter, Wallsend
 Laid down: 10 August 1939
 Launched: 9 April 1940
 Completed: 12 October 1940
 Fate: Paid off 20 May 1946. Sold to Nationalist China 1947 and renamed Lin Fu. Seized prior to delivery and re-sold 1949 to Egypt as Mohamed Ali el Kebir, renamed Ibrahim el Awal in 1951, captured by Israel on 31 October 1956 and commissioned as INS Haifa (K-38), decommissioned 1968, used as training target and sunk by a Gabriel missile.
 
 Builder: Swan Hunter, Wallsend
 Laid down: 10 August 1939
 Launched: 7 June 1940
 Completed: 30 December 1940
 Fate: Aircraft target ship 11 September 1945 to December 1946, when paid off. Sold to Ecuador 1954 and renamed Presidente Velasco Ibarra. 05/05/1978: Stricken and broken up.
 
 Builder: Scotts, Greenock
 Laid down: 26 July 1939
 Launched: 13 February 1940
 Completed: 23 October 1940
 Fate: Paid off August 1946 and broken up 1 December 1956.
 
 Builder: Scotts, Greenock
 Laid down: 26 July 1939
 Launched: 22 April 1940
 Completed: 6 February 1941
 Fate: Paid off December 1945. Sold to Ecuador 1954 and renamed Presidente Alfaro.
 
 Builder: J. Samuel White, Cowes
 Laid down: 26 July 1939
 Launched: 27 March 1940
 Completed: 21 September 1940
 Fate: Sunk by a human torpedo off the Normandy beaches during the D-Day invasion, 2 August 1944.
 
 Builder: J. Samuel White, Cowes
 Laid down: 22 August 1939
 Launched: 5 July 1940
 Completed: 8 November 1940
 Fate: Aircraft target ship 8 September 1945 to 1946. Paid off 22 May 1946, and broken up 1 November 1956.
 
 Builder: Stephens, Linthouse
 Laid down: 27 July 1939
 Launched: 5 June 1940
 Completed: 2 December 1940
 Fate: Sunk by the German submarine U-593 on 12 December 1943.
 
 Builder: Stephens, Linthouse
 Laid down: 27 July 1939
 Launched: 16 July 1940
 Completed: 28 February 1941
 Fate: Paid off October 1945 and broken up 5 April 1959.

Type II

Eighteen were ordered on 4 September 1939 and two more (Lauderdale and Ledbury) on the following day. Three of these were completed with the same armament as the Type I – Blencathra, Brocklesby and Liddesdale. A final batch of sixteen were ordered on 20 December 1939.
  – John Brown, Clydebank
  – To the Royal Norwegian Navy as Arendal
  – sold to Norway 1956. Scrapped in 1965
  – scrapped 1956
  – To the Royal Danish Navy in 1954 as Esbern Snare (F341). Scrapped 1966
  – John Brown, Clydebank
  – Cammell Laird, Birkenhead
  – To the Royal Hellenic Navy as Themistocles
  – Cammell Laird, sold and scrapped in 1968
  – To the Royal Danish Navy in 1954 as Rolf Krake (F342). Scrapped 1966
Scrapped circa 1975
  – scrapped 1959
  –  scrapped 1957
  – Lost 13 November 1943
  – sold for scrap 1946
  – To the Royal Danish Navy in 1954 as Valdemar Sejr (F343). Scrapped 1966
  – Scrapped at Blyth on 4 December 1962
  – Lost 12 June 1942
  – Lost 20 March 1942
  – To the Royal Hellenic Navy as Kriti
  – Lost 22 October 1943
  – Transferred on loan to the Royal Hellenic Navy as Aigaion in 1946. Discarded 1959
  – scrapped in 1958
  – Vickers-Armstrongs, Tyne, BU 1948
  – scrapped 1958
  (i) – To the Polish Navy as Kujawiak
  (ii) – begun as Tickham and renamed. Sold in 1958 to West Germany where she served as the Gneisenau and was broken up in 1972
  – Lost 6 September 1943, by U-boat , 129 crew rescued
  – To the Polish Navy as Krakowiak
  – Lost 24 March 1942, Malta convoy MW10, Zonker Point, Malta
  – scrapped 1957
  – scrapped 1959
  – Yarrow, Scotstoun
  – loaned to Norway 1952. Sold to Norway in 1956. Scrapped in 1965

Type III

  – J. Brown – Lost June 1942 after aerial attack
  – J. Brown – To Federal German Navy in 1959 as Raule
  – Cammell Laird – Mined December 1944.
  – Cammell Laird
  – Hawthorn Leslie – Lost December 1942, torpedoed by 
  – Vickers-Armstrongs
  – Swan Hunter – Transferred to Greece as Pindos
  – Swan Hunter – Transferred to Greece as Adrias. Written off after mined October 1943
  – Vickers-Armstrongs – Bought by Greece in 1946 as Hastings
  – Vickers-Armstrongs – Written off after torpedoed by aircraft March 1943
  – White
  – White –  Sold to Federal German Navy in 1959 as Brommy
  – Cammell Laird –  Transferred to Royal Norwegian Navy. Torpedoed by E boat April 1943
  – Cammell Laird –  Transferred to Royal Norwegian Navy. Bought by Norway 1946 as Narvik
  – Fairfield –  Written off after mined July 1944
Mined February 1945
  – Vickers-Armstrongs – Transferred to Greece as Kanaris
  – Vickers-Armstrongs
  – Stephens – Torpedoed by T-22 October 1943
  – Swan Hunter
  – Swan Hunter – Transferred to Greece as Miaoulis
  – Vickers-Armstrongs – Torpedoed by E-boat December 1942
  – Vickers-Armstrongs – Written off after hit by a Henschel Hs 293 glider bomb November 1943
  – White
  – White – Launched in 1943 and sold for scrapping in 1961
  – Yarrow – Bought by Greece 1946 as Adrias
  – Yarrow –  Written off after collision November 1944

Type IV

These very distinct vessels were built to a radically different private design by Thornycroft at Southampton, ordered on 28 July 1940.

 Laid down: 27 February 1941
 Launched: 27 June 1942
 Completed: 18 December 1942
 Fate: Paid off 4 December 1945 and broken up on 17 September 1962 at Faslane.
 
 Laid down: 28 February 1941
 Launched: 15 September 1942
 Completed: 12 February 1943
 Fate: Paid off 19 June 1948 and broken up on 3 March 1965 at Dalmuir.

Notes

Bibliography
 
 The Hunts: A History of the Design, Development and Careers of the 86 Destroyers of This Class Built for the Royal and Allied Navies During World War II, John English, World Ship Society, 1987, 
 Destroyers of the Royal Navy, 1893–1981, Maurice Cocker, Ian Allan, 
 Royal Navy Destroyers Since 1945, Leo Marriott, Ian Allan, 
 Conway's All the World's Fighting Ships 1922–1946, Ed. Robert Gardiner, Naval Institute Press, 
 Destroyers of World War Two: An International Encyclopedia, M. J. Whitley, Arms and Armour Press, 1999, .
 Nelson to Vanguard, D. K. Brown, Chatham Publishing, 2000, 
 British and Empire Warships of the Second World War, H T Lenton, Greenhill Books,

External links

 Czech site
 Uboat site
 Free cardstock model plan of Hunt Type 1 Escort Destroyer, to print off and assemble

Destroyer classes
Frigate classes
 
Ship classes of the Royal Navy
Ship classes of the French Navy